Monardella australis is a species of flowering plant in the mint family, known by the common name southern monardella.

Distribution
The plant is endemic to southern California, in the Greater Los Angeles Area. It is known only from populations in the San Gabriel Mountains and San Bernardino Mountains of the eastern Transverse Ranges, and the adjacent San Jacinto Mountains of the Peninsular Ranges.

Its habitats include the red fir forest and yellow pine forest on the higher slopes of the ranges.

Description
Monardella australis is a perennial herb growing in a small tuft and producing long, sometimes erect flowering stems. The pale green or grayish leaves are oval or lance-shaped and often toothed.

The inflorescence is a head of several flowers blooming in a cup of pinkish green bracts. Each flower is up to 2 centimeters long and pinkish in color.

Subspecies
Subspecies include:
 Monardella australis ssp. australis
 Monardella australis ssp. cinerea —  endemic to San Gabriel Mountains, formerly southern population of Monardella cinerea.
 Monardella australis ssp. jokerstii —  endemic to eastern San Gabriel Mountains, critically endangered species (as subspecies).

References

External links
  Calflora Database: Monardella australis (Southern monardella,  Southern mountain monardella)
  Jepson Manual eFlora (TJM2) treatment of  Monardella australis
 USDA Plants Profile for Monardella australis (southern monardella)
 UC Photos gallery: Monardella australis

australis
Endemic flora of California
Natural history of the California chaparral and woodlands
Natural history of the Peninsular Ranges
Natural history of the Transverse Ranges
Flora of Riverside County, California
Natural history of Los Angeles County, California
Natural history of San Bernardino County, California
~
~
Flora and fauna of the San Jacinto Mountains
Taxa named by LeRoy Abrams
Flora without expected TNC conservation status